Moishe Finkel (c. 1850 – June 7, 1904) (also known as Morris or Maurice Finkel) was a prominent figure in the early years of Yiddish theater. He was business partner first of Abraham Goldfaden and later of Sigmund Mogulesko (the greatest Yiddish star of the generation) and, for a time, was married to prima donna Annetta Schwartz. Together, they dominated Yiddish theatre in Bucharest in the early 1880s and in New York City in the late 1880s and into the 1890s, with a repertoire based mainly in the works of Joseph Lateiner and Moses Horowitz.

After divorcing Schwartz, who returned to Europe, Finkel, then in his 40s, married 16-year-old Emma Thomashefsky, sister of one of the most powerful figures in Yiddish theatre, Boris Thomashefsky. They had two children, but their relationship was always troubled and eventually Emma Finkel left her husband and began divorce proceedings. Her suit mentioned examples of spousal cruelty including violence. She began a relationship with another actor, David Levinson. At the same time, Moishe Finkel's business partnership with Jacob Adler, which entailed managing the Grand Theatre together, ended with a bitter dispute and a legal battle for control of the theatre eventually settled in Adler's favor. Emma Finkel and her lover had continued working for Adler.

On June 7, 1904, while Emma, the children and Levinson were staying at a summer colony in New Jersey, Finkel turned up unexpectedly and shot his wife, Levinson, and himself. He killed himself and seriously injured his wife. Levinson was unhurt.

Jacob Adler wrote of him that he "never smiled" and other contemporaneous accounts concur that he had a difficult personality. Finkel's son from his first marriage, Abem Finkel, became a Hollywood scriptwriter. The children from his marriage to Emma, Bella and Lucy Finkel, became Yiddish actors. Bella married Paul Muni. Emma Thomashefsky Finkel lived partially paralyzed for a number of years, and continued to act in roles that could be played sitting down. She died of complications from her condition in 1929, aged 46.

Notes

References
Adler, Jacob, A Life on the Stage: A Memoir, translated and with commentary by Lulla Rosenfeld, Knopf, New York, 1999, . Especially p. 86.
Jones, Faith. "Stage Killing: Solving an Attempted Murder-Suicide." The Forward, Oct. 13, 2006.
Lawrence, Jerome. Actor: The Life and Times of Paul Muni. New York: Putnam, 1974. 
Leksikon fun Yidishn Teater vol. 4. New York, 1963.
Bercovici, Israil, O sută de ani de teatru evreiesc în România ("One hundred years of Yiddish/Jewish theater in Romania"), 2nd Romanian-language edition, revised and augmented by Constantin Măciucă. Editura Integral (an imprint of Editurile Universala), Bucharest (1998). . See the article on the author for further publication information.

1850 births
1904 deaths
American people of Romanian-Jewish descent
Jewish American male actors
Romanian Ashkenazi Jews
Yiddish theatre performers
Year of birth uncertain
1904 suicides